Datin Malai Hajah Halimah Malai Haji Yusoff, the Ambassador Extraordinary and Plenipotentiary of Brunei Darussalam to France, presented her credentials as Permanent Delegate to the United Nations Education, Scientific and Cultural Organization (UNESCO) on 28 September 2017.  She became Ambassador of Brunei Darussalam in the Philippines in 2008 and Monaco in 2018.

References

Bruneian women ambassadors
Ambassadors of Brunei to the Philippines
Ambassadors of Brunei to Monaco
Ambassadors of Brunei to France
Permanent Delegates of Brunei to UNESCO